Dell City is a city in Hudspeth County, Texas. The population was 365 at the time of the 2010 census, down from 413 at the time of the 2000 census. It is near the former location of Paulville, a failed Ron Paul-inspired Libertarian cooperative and planned community.

It was incorporated in 1948, shortly after the discovery of an underground water supply by oil prospectors, which attracted farmers to the area. Its name is a reference to the nursery rhyme "The Farmer in the Dell."

History
Dell City was established in 1948, as an aquifer had been found in the area. Settlers came from other areas of Texas and New Mexico. It developed into being a farming town. The community had about 500 people in the 1950s.

In 2012, Jeanne Catsoulis of The New York Times described Dell City as "a borderline ghost town". In 2014, there were 336 people, according to the United States Census Bureau, with 50 being the average age. In 2016, Jessica Onsurez wrote that residents in the town, which had a decline in the number of businesses, are divided over whether the town is "dying", in her words, or whether it will rebound. Residents rejected proposals to establish a prison and a manufacturing plant.

Geography

Dell City is located in northeastern Hudspeth County at  (31.935324, –105.200298), in West Texas. The Guadalupe Mountains are visible to the east.

Texas Highways states that it is about 45 minutes travel time away.

Economy
As of 2019 the major sectors are farming and ranching. There were multiple farms owned by families and two cotton gins that provided employment. By 2016 the number of farms had declined. By 2019 several alfalfa growing operations were established and several persons from the Mesilla Valley and the area around Hatch, New Mexico began growing chile peppers on leased land around Dell City.

In 1979 there were three grocery stores and four bars. By 1989 there was only one grocery and general store, Dell City Mercantile, which had burned down in a fire that year. There were also three bars, two gas stations, two restaurants, a hardware store, and a video rental business. In 2016 the city had one grocery store, Two T's Grocery, in a former bar. Additionally as of that year there was one restaurant, Spanish Angel Cafe.

 no barber shops are in Dell City nor in the rest of Hudspeth County.

By 2019 a business owner began operating an Airbnb from several previously disused buildings.

Healthcare
In 1989 there was one doctor who had office hours on Wednesdays in Dell City, but otherwise townfolk had to travel to El Paso to get medical appointments.  the closest hospital is in El Paso.

Townscape
There are no traffic lights in town. Several of the buildings are in an adobe style. As it was established in the 20th century, it lacks prior architecture found in other small towns in Texas.

Education

The area is served by the Dell City Independent School District. The district has just one school covering grades kindergarten through 12. In 1949 a teacher from Sierra Blanca Independent School District was sent to Dell City on request by Dell City residents, and another teacher, Grace Grebing, took over the role in 1950; she became the first superintendent of Dell City ISD.

The district operates Grace Grebing Public Library which also serves as a community library for Dell City. It was named after a longtime teacher.

Hudspeth County is within the official service area of El Paso Community College.

Demographics

2020 census

As of the 2020 United States census, there were 245 people, 83 households, and 30 families residing in the city.

2000 census
As of the census of 2000, 413 people, 155 households, and 119 families resided in the city. The population density was 250.1 people per square mile (96.6/km). The 226 housing units averaged 136.9 per square mile (52.9/km). The racial makeup of the city was 61.50% White, 1.45% African American, 1.94% Native American, 0.24% Asian, 32.69% from other races, and 2.18% from two or more races. Hispanic or Latinos of any race were 69.25% of the population.

Of the 155 households, 36.8% had children under the age of 18 living with them, 63.9% were married couples living together, 11.6% had a female householder with no husband present, and 22.6% were not families. About 20.6% of all households were made up of individuals, and 7.7% had someone living alone who was 65 years of age or older. The average household size was 2.66 and the average family size was 3.11.

In the city, the population was distributed as 30.5% under the age of 18, 6.3% from 18 to 24, 21.8% from 25 to 44, 28.1% from 45 to 64, and 13.3% who were 65 years of age or older. The median age was 37 years. For every 100 females, there were 105.5 males. For every 100 females age 18 and over, there were 95.2 males.

The median income for a household in the city was $19,602, and for a family was $21,667. Males had a median income of $24,135 versus $18,571 for females. The per capita income for the city was $9,580. About 26.4% of families and 29.4% of the population were below the poverty line, including 33.1% of those under age 18 and 38.6% of those age 65 or over.

Climate

Media
The Dell Valley Review began publication in Dell City in 1956. It became known as the Hudspeth County Herald in 1964. Its offices are now in Odessa. The publication maintains a mailing address PO Box in Fort Hancock. The full name is Hudspeth County Herald and Dell Valley Review. In 2012 the newspaper had one employee, who served as the editor.

In culture
The filmmaker Josh Carter, beginning in 2002, assisted the creation of four films created by natives of Dell City, and he spliced them into a single work called Tales from Dell City, Texas, released in 2012. Catsoulis wrote that the film "immortalizes a dusty slice of vanishing Americana, delivering a parched ode to hard work, endurance and desert dreams."

Notable people
 Laura Lynch, founder and member of the original Dixie Chicks

Gallery

References

External links

 Information about Dell City sponsored by the Dell City Chamber of Commerce.
 About Hudspeth County herald and Dell Valley review. [volume] (Dell city, Tex.) 1964-current - Library of Congress
 Hudspeth County Herald and Dell Valley Review (Dell City, Tex.), Vol. 9, No. 51, Ed. 1 Friday, August 13, 1965 - Digital Public Library of America
  - The earliest census map posted online, from 1990: 1990 COUNTY BLOCK MAP (RECREATED): HUDSPETH County Page A - 2000 Map - 2010 Map

Cities in Texas
Cities in Hudspeth County, Texas
1948 establishments in Texas